Hasanabad (also Romanized as Ḩasanābād) is a village in Keybar Rural District, Jolgeh Zozan District, Khaf County, Razavi Khorasan Province, Iran. At the 2006 census, its population was 615, in 133 families.

References 

Populated places in Khaf County